Wanger is a surname. Notable people with the name include: 

Ben Wanger (born 1997), American-Israeli baseball pitcher for Team Israel
 Irving Price Wanger (1852–1940), American politician
 Walter Wanger (1894–1968), American film producer
Oliver Winston Wanger (born 1940), American judge
Klaus Wanger (born 1941), Liechtenstein politician

See also
Wanger Township, Marshall County, Minnesota
Wagner (disambiguation)